Yucca decipiens Trel. is a large, branching member of the Asparagaceae, native to north-central Mexico from Durango to San Luís Potosí. It is evergreen, up to 20 feet (6 m) tall, growing at elevations of 1500–2000 m in the mountains. Common name is "palma china," which means "Chinese palm."

Yucca decipiens is relatively abundant, and although it has local threats, its population appears to be stable overall.

References

decipiens
Flora of Mexico
Flora of Durango
Flora of Coahuila
Flora of Chihuahua (state)
Flora of Zacatecas
Taxa named by William Trelease